Eduardo Jacinto de Biasi (born 9 January 1997), simply known as Eduardo, is a Brazilian footballer who plays as a defensive midfielder for Avaí.

Club career
Born in Três de Maio, Santa Catarina, Eduardo joined Criciúma's youth setup in 2014, after a recommendation from his brother, who was already in the club's first team. He made his senior debut on 12 April 2015, coming on as a late substitute in a 1–0 Campeonato Catarinense home win over Metropolitano.

Mainly used in the under-20 squad afterwards, Eduardo moved to Cruzeiro on a one-year loan deal. However, he only featured for the under-20s, and returned to Criciúma for the 2018 campaign, where he became a starter.

On 13 January 2022, Eduardo signed a two-year contract with Avaí, newly promoted to the Série A.

Personal life
Eduardo's older brother Ezequiel is also a footballer. A right back, he too was groomed at Criciúma.

Career statistics

References

External links

1997 births
Living people
Sportspeople from Santa Catarina (state)
Brazilian footballers
Association football midfielders
Campeonato Brasileiro Série B players
Campeonato Brasileiro Série C players
Criciúma Esporte Clube players
Avaí FC players